Alireza Haghi (born 8 February 1979) is an Iranian road bicycle racer. He competed at the 2012 Summer Olympics in the Men's road race, but failed to finish.  In the time trial he finished 36th  

ne.

References

Iranian male cyclists
1979 births
Living people
Olympic cyclists of Iran
Cyclists at the 2012 Summer Olympics
Asian Games silver medalists for Iran
Asian Games medalists in cycling
Cyclists at the 1998 Asian Games
Cyclists at the 2002 Asian Games
Cyclists at the 2006 Asian Games
Cyclists at the 2010 Asian Games
Iranian sportspeople in doping cases
Medalists at the 2002 Asian Games
Medalists at the 2006 Asian Games
21st-century Iranian people